Belisırma is a village in Güzelyurt District, Aksaray Province, Turkey. Its population is 502 (2021). Although a small village, Belisırma is well known because of various ruins around it. The church ruins of Ala, Bezirhane, Karagedik and Direkli are Byzantine cave churches.

References

Villages in Güzelyurt District, Aksaray